Yuta Nakatsuka (中務裕太 Nakatsuka Yuta, born 7 January 1993) is a Japanese Dancer and actor, He is one of the performers of the Japanese all-male dance and music group Generations from Exile Tribe.

Nakatsuka is represented with LDH.

Early life 
Yuta Nakatsuka was born on January 7, 1993, in Osaka, Japan.

Yuta got interested in dancing due to his mother's love for American music, especially Black music. With his mother's influence he grew up listening to artists such as Stevie Wonder, Babyface and Eric Clapton, but no Japanese music at all. She even took him to live shows of Earth Wind & Fire and other artists. At the age of 6, Yuta decided to become a dancer and started attending the dance school "Dance Studio BOOM" in Ibaraki, Osaka, which was recommended by his parents. There, he met his first dance teachers, the choreographer duo Hilty & Bosch. They taught an acrobatics class and also inspired Yuta to start Locking. Despite being the youngest in their class, Yuta stood out as one of the best students. At the same dance school, Yuta also took classes of other instructors such as Boo (the owner of the dance school), Cherry from Wild Cherry, Rei (the father of You from Hilty & Bosch), Yuki (boss of Osaka dancer) and Skeeter Rabbit (member of The Electric Boogaloos) because he was interested to try out all kinds of dance styles. When he was 16, Yuta started attending EXPG Osaka, LDH's talent school, after he was scouted by the company during a dance event from Dance Studio BOOM. He was chosen to become an instructor there in the same year due to the high level of his skills. His most notable former student at EXPG Osaka is Twice's Sana.

When Yuta was 18 years old, he moved to Tokyo. At that time, he had troubles deciding what his future as a dancer should look like. While he was part of the Popping crew Yuki Dojo from his former dancing instructor Yuki at Dance Studio BOOM, they won 2nd place at the JAPAN DANCE DELIGHT vol.18 dance tournament. This experience had a major impact on Yuta's life since he was selected as a support member for Generations in 2011. Yuki then sent him off with the best wishes to find his path for the future and the promise that he can return to Yuki's crew any time, which motivated Yuta to do his best in his career as an artist.

Career 
In 2012, and just before the group's major debut, he became an official member after Keita Machida's withdrawal.

In March 2014, he participated in Exile Performer Battle Audition and made it to the finals but wasn't selected to join EXILE.

In October 2019, he made his acting debut in the movie "High & Low The Worst".

Works

Choreography

Filmography

Movies

TV Dramas

TV Shows

Live

Awards

Dance Competitions

References

External links 

 Official Website (in English)

1993 births
Living people
Japanese male dancers
People from Osaka Prefecture
Musicians from Osaka Prefecture
LDH (company) artists